Ottawa River Canoe Club (ORCC) is a non-profit paddling organization in operation since 2002 and located in the west-end of Ottawa, Ontario, Canada. The organization offers a variety of recreational and competitive paddling programs for everyone, including:

summer camps for kids 5 to 14
stand-up paddleboarding (SUP)
canoe and kayak introductory courses
competitive sprint canoe/kayak racing
"Paddle All" and para paddling - for our disabled athletes
adventure racing instruction
outrigger
dragon boat

The club is a member of the Eastern Ontario Division (EOD) of Canoe Kayak Canada (Canoe Kayak Eastern Ontario Division). The sport of flat water sprint racing is represented by the Ontario Canoe Sprint Racing Affiliation (OCSRA) of Canoe Ontario.

References

Jessica Cunha. "The little canoe club that could; Ottawa River Canoe Club celebrates 12 years of growth". Ottawa Community News. 11 September 2014.

External links
 Ottawa River Canoe Club

Canoe clubs in Canada
2002 establishments in Ontario
Organizations based in Ottawa
Sport in Ottawa